Renata da Silva Souza is a Brazilian politician. In 2018, Souza was elected a state deputy in the Legislative Assembly of Rio de Janeiro.

References

Members of the Legislative Assembly of Rio de Janeiro
1982 births
Living people